Aleksei Poluyan (1965–2010) was a Russian actor. His most famous role was that of the sadistic Captain Zhurov in Alexey Balabanov's anti-communist horror movie Cargo 200. Poluyan died from alcohol abuse in 2010.

Filmography

References

1965 births
2010 deaths
Deaths from pancreatitis
Alcohol-related deaths in Russia
20th-century Russian male actors
21st-century Russian male actors
Russian male film actors
Russian male stage actors